Bahrain competed at the 1984 Summer Paralympics in Stoke Mandeville, Great Britain and New York City, United States. 12 competitors from Bahrain won 2 medals, both bronze and finished 43rd and last in the medal table.

See also 
 Bahrain at the Paralympics
 Bahrain at the 1984 Summer Olympics

References 

Bahrain at the Paralympics
Nations at the 1984 Summer Paralympics
1984 in Bahraini sport